Brandon McArthur Shell (born February 6, 1992) is an American football offensive tackle for the Miami Dolphins of the National Football League (NFL). He played college football at South Carolina. He is the great nephew of Pro Football Hall of Fame tackle Art Shell.

Early years
A native of Goose Creek, South Carolina, Shell attended Goose Creek High School, where he was an All-American offensive lineman. Regarded as a four-star recruit by Rivals.com, Shell was ranked as the fourth best offensive tackle in his class.

College career
Shell attended the University of South Carolina, where he played college football. He made 47 consecutive starts for the Gamecocks.  As a redshirt senior in 2015, Shell earned the start at left tackle for every game.  In 2014 and 2013, Shell played every game at right tackle.  In 2012 as a redshirt freshman, Shell started at left tackle before transitioning to right side.  For the 2012 season he started 10 out of 13 games and earned Freshman All-SEC honors and was named first-team Freshman All-American by FoxSportsNext.com.

Shell was invited to play in the East-West Shrine game following his senior season.

Professional career
Coming out of college, Shell was projected by many analysts to be either a sixth or seventh round selection. He was ranked the 20th best offensive tackle out of the 108 available by NFLDraftScout.com.

New York Jets
Shell was selected in the fifth round with the 158th overall pick by the New York Jets in the 2016 NFL Draft. On May 7, 2016, the Jets signed Shell to a four-year, $2.91 million rookie contract with a signing bonus of $551,133.

Shell became a starter for the Jets in 2017, starting 12 games at right tackle, missing four games due to shoulder and neck injuries and a concussion.

In 2018, Shell started the first 14 games at right tackle before suffering a knee injury in Week 15. He was placed on injured reserve on December 19, 2018.

Seattle Seahawks
On March 24, 2020, Shell signed a two-year, $11 million contract with the Seattle Seahawks. He was placed on the reserve/COVID-19 list by the team on January 2, 2021, and activated three days later.

In the 2021 season, Shell started 10 games for the Seahawks before being placed on injured reserve with a shoulder injury.

Miami Dolphins
On September 19, 2022, Shell signed with the practice squad of the Miami Dolphins. He was elevated for Week 6 and started at right tackle. He was signed to the active roster on October 22.

References

External links 
South Carolina Gamecocks football bio

1992 births
Living people
American football offensive tackles
Miami Dolphins players
New York Jets players
People from Goose Creek, South Carolina
Players of American football from South Carolina
Seattle Seahawks players
South Carolina Gamecocks football players